Gérard Deltell  (born August 8, 1964) is a Canadian politician who has served as the member of Parliament (MP) for Louis-Saint-Laurent since 2015. A member of the Conservative Party, Deltell was Opposition House Leader from 2020 to 2022 under Erin O'Toole and held a number of opposition critic positions. Prior to entering federal politics, he represented Chauveau in the National Assembly of Quebec from 2008 to 2015 and was the leader of the Action démocratique du Québec (ADQ) from 2009 until it merged with the Coalition Avenir Québec (CAQ) in 2012. He served as the CAQ's house leader until 2014.

Early life, education and career
Deltell was born and raised in Quebec City. He held party membership in the Progressive Conservative Party of Canada in the 1980s.

Deltell's parents are both Pied-Noirs born in Algeria at a time when this country was part of France. As his parents are French citizens Deltell also holds French citizenship by virtue of his birth (jus sanguinis). Deltell is a Spanish name, his father's family was settled in Algeria by 1840 and his maternal family's roots are French and Italian. His parents immigrated to Canada and settled in Montreal in 1958, but relocated later in the year to Loretteville, near Quebec City. His father, Guy, served in a Moroccan regiment of the French Army of the Second World War and was awarded the French Legion of Honour on October 26, 2011.

Deltell studied social science at Cégep de Sainte-Foy, graduating in 1984. He majored in history at Université Laval and graduated in 1989. He also received training as an announcer at the Collège des annonceurs radio télévision in 1982 and at École de radio et de télévision Promédia in 1993. He received a pilot's license for ultralight aircraft in 2005.

Journalism career 
Before he entered politics, Deltell worked as a TV correspondent with TQS. He also worked for the TVA and Radio-Canada stations in Quebec City, as well as the CIRO-FM radio station as a radio show host. Overall, he worked as a journalist for a total of over 20 years.

Political career

Provincial politics 
Deltell ran as the Action démocratique du Québec candidate in the district of Chauveau in the 2008 provincial election. He won the seat with 44% of the vote and succeeded Gilles Taillon, who ran and lost in Chapleau.

On November 19, 2009, Deltell replaced Taillon as leader of the ADQ.

During his tenure as ADQ leader, Deltell was noted as a stabilizing factor inside the party after the 2009 leadership race caused a power vacuum in the party. He improved the fortunes of the ADQ in the polls, bringing them back to 20% in the polls. The ADQ were also polling well in the Quebec City region and other noted Conservative areas.

He ceased being leader of the ADQ upon the dissolution of the party into the new movement established by François Legault, the Coalition Avenir Québec. Deltell served as parliamentary leader of the CAQ caucus until the 2012 Quebec general election. From 2012 to 2014 he served as house leader for the CAQ.

Federal politics 
Following much speculation, Deltell announced on April 7, 2015, that he would be running for the Conservative Party of Canada in the riding of Louis-Saint-Laurent in the upcoming federal election. His resignation as MNA for Chauveau took effect the same day. Deltell was elected MP on October 19, 2015. The Conservative Party saw a resurgence in support in the Quebec City region, with Deltell receiving credit for the party's increased support.

Since going to Ottawa, Deltell has been considered a rising star within the Conservative caucus. Opposition leader Rona Ambrose named Deltell the party's Quebec lieutenant and critic for Employment, Workforce and Labour, and he has been noted for his strong performances during Question Period. Despite being a newcomer to federal politics, Deltell was mentioned as a possible leadership candidate to replace former leader Stephen Harper. While he brushed aside the idea, Deltell received support from within the Conservative caucus to run, but he announced his support for Erin O'Toole. Globe and Mail columnist Jefferey Simpson wrote that "he ticks off a number of Conservative/conservative boxes." Deltell was a critic of the legalization of marijuana and vowed to prevent the legalization from happening. Cannabis was legalized in 2018.

Deltell was one of three Conservatives named to the membership of the Special Committee on Electoral Reform.

On October 16, 2016, Deltell was appointed Official Opposition Finance Critic by Rona Ambrose, interim leader of the Conservative Party of Canada. Conservative Leader Andrew Scheer announced his shadow cabinet on August 30, 2017 and named Deltell as critic for the Treasury Board. On September 2, 2020, Conservative leader Erin O'Toole announced that Deltell would serve as Opposition House Leader, succeeding Candice Bergen.

Electoral record

Federal

Provincial

References

External links

1964 births
Action démocratique du Québec MNAs
Canadian people of French descent
Canadian television journalists
Coalition Avenir Québec MNAs
French Quebecers
Living people
Politicians from Quebec City
Université Laval alumni
Conservative Party of Canada MPs
Members of the House of Commons of Canada from Quebec
21st-century Canadian politicians
Canadian people of Italian descent